Le Villi (The Willis or The Fairies) is an opera–ballet in two acts (originally one) composed by Giacomo Puccini to an Italian libretto by Ferdinando Fontana, based on the short story "Les Willis" by Jean-Baptiste Alphonse Karr. Karr's story was in turn based in the Central European legend of the Vila, also used in the ballet Giselle. The opera, in its original one-act version, was first performed at the Teatro Dal Verme, Milan, on 31 May 1884.

Le Villi is Puccini's first stage work. It was written for an 1883 competition of one-act operas by the publisher Sonzogno in his periodical Il teatro illustrato, but did not even earn an honourable mention. According to Mosco Carner, this may have been because it was written in such haste that the score was all but illegible. His supporters, who included Arrigo Boito, funded the first production, whose favorable reception led to publication by Giulio Ricordi. Puccini's mother received the following telegram on the night of premiere at the Teatro dal Verme on 31 May 1884: "Theatre packed, immense success; anticipations exceeded; eighteen calls; finale of first act encored thrice"'. Ricordi urged the composer to expand the work, and Puccini did, producing a new version later that year, which was followed by modifications in 1885, and the final version in 1889. A performance typically lasts 64 minutes.

Performance history

In the libretto, each part of the symphonic intermezzo between acts 1 and 2 – L'Abbandono (The Desertion) and La tregenda (The Spectre) – is preceded by explanatory verses recounting the intervening events. Michele Girardi, citing a letter from Fontana to Puccini on 3 September 1884, has pointed out that the librettist intended for these to be read by the audience but not actually recited by a narrator. But according to Mosco Carner, Puccini had intended for the verses to be read out to the audience, although he notes there is no mention of this having actually happened in contemporary reviews of the first production. Likewise, there is no record of a narrator having been used at the first performance of Le Villi at the Metropolitan Opera in 1908. Nevertheless, a narrator is used in some modern productions of the opera, such as the September 2004 production at the Teatro Dal Verme with Leo Nucci as the narrator, and the August 1994 production at the Festival della Valle d'Itria in Martina Franca with Massimo Foschi as narrator. A narrator (Tito Gobbi) is also used in the Sony 1981 studio recording of the work.

A revised, two-act version was performed in at the Teatro Regio, Turin, on 26 December 1884. Le Villi was also performed at the Teatro San Carlo in Naples on 15 January 1888. However, on that occasion it was not viewed favourably by either the audience or the critics who characterized it as "simply an imitation of Wagner". Puccini continued to revise the work up until its Hamburg premiere in 1892, conducted by Gustav Mahler.

The UK premiere, by the Carl Rosa Opera Company occurred on 24 September 1897 at the Comedy Theatre in Manchester, and the US premiere came on 17 December 1908 at the New York Metropolitan Opera conducted by Arturo Toscanini. Performed as a double bill with Mascagni's Cavalleria rusticana, the Met's production featured Frances Alda as Anna and Alessandro Bonci as Roberto. The work did not receive its premiere at the Vienna State Opera until 23 October 2005, when it was performed in a double bill with Leoš Janáček's Osud. Simone Young conducted the performance with Krassimira Stoyanova as Anna and José Cura as Roberto.

The UK premiere of the original version, and the first performance anywhere since the first performance on 31 May 1884, took place in London's Royal Festival Hall on 21 November 2018. It was given by the London Philharmonic Orchestra under Sir Mark Elder. The soloists were Ermonela Jaho, Brian Mulligan and Arsen Soghomonyan with the Opera Rara Chorus.

Roles

Synopsis
Place: The Black Forest
Time: Indeterminate

Act 1

Spring

Family and guests dance at a celebration of the engagement in marriage of Roberto and Anna. Roberto must leave before the ceremony to collect an inheritance, and Anna worries that she will never see him again (Aria: Se come voi piccina). Roberto comforts Anna telling her that it will be fine and they will marry when he returns from Mainz. Anna tells Roberto of her dreams of him dying but Roberto tells Anna that she should not worry about his love failing and that she may doubt her God but not his love for her. The crowd returns and Anna is still worried about Roberto leaving. Roberto then asks Guglielmo, Anna's father, to bless them before his journey and Roberto sets off for Mainz.

Intermezzo
Roberto is enchanted by a siren, and forgets Anna. Anna waits through the summer and the autumn and in the winter dies in his absence. The legend of the fairies (Le Villi) is then explained. When a woman dies of a broken heart, the fairies force the heart breaker to dance until death.

Act 2
Winter

Anna's father, Guglielmo, holds Roberto responsible for Anna's death and calls upon the Villi to take vengeance on Roberto (Aria: Anima santa della figlia mia). The Villi call upon the ghost of Anna and lure Roberto into the forest. Roberto, now penniless and abandoned by the seductress, returns when news of Anna's death reaches him. Hoping that he will be forgiven, the Villi stalk Roberto as he mourns the loss of the days of his youth (Aria: Torna ai felici dì). Roberto then finds the one last flower left alive in the winter and tries to find hope that Anna lives but is repelled by the Villi when he tries to knock on the door of Guglielmo's house. Roberto then tries to pray for forgiveness but finds he cannot because of the curse put upon him by the Villi. As Roberto curses his fate Anna appears to him and tells him of the suffering that she had to endure. Roberto begs for forgiveness and he too feels the pain of Anna burning in his heart. But Roberto is not forgiven and Anna calls upon the Villi, who curse Roberto with cries of "traitor." There, the Villi and Anna dance with Roberto until he dies of exhaustion at Anna's feet.

Recordings

Notes and references
Notes

References

Sources
 
 
 
 
 {{cite web|last=Capon|date=n.d.|first=Brian|url=http://www.operadis-opera-discography.org.uk/CLPUVILL.HTM|title=Recordings of Le Villi|website=operadis-opera-discography.org.uk}}
 
 
 
 

Further reading
Schickling, Dieter, Giacomo Puccini – Catalogue of the Works, Bärenreiter 2003, pp. 133–148 and pp. 410–411 (Appendix IV – Autograph Material for Le Villi'').

External links

 Synopsis from Naxos Records
 Libretto in English, impresario.ch
 Libretto in Italian, (with stage directions in English), opera.stanford.edu

Operas by Giacomo Puccini
Italian-language operas
1884 operas
Operas
[[Category:Opéras-ballets].]